The cryptic warbler (Cryptosylvicola randrianasoloi) is a species of Malagasy warbler in the family Bernieriidae. It was formerly placed in the Old World warbler family Sylviidae. It is endemic to Madagascar.

References

 del Hoyo, J.; Elliot, A. & Christie D. (editors). (2006). Handbook of the Birds of the World. Volume 11: Old World Flycatchers to Old World Warblers. Lynx Edicions. .

Malagasy warblers
cryptic warbler
Taxonomy articles created by Polbot